Lamivudine/tenofovir disoproxil, sold under the brand name Cimduo among others, is a fixed-dose combination antiretroviral medication for the treatment of HIV/AIDS in adults and children weighing more than . It contains lamivudine and tenofovir disoproxil. It is taken by mouth.

Lamivudine/tenofovir was approved for medical use in the United States in February 2018.

References

Further reading

External links 
 
 
 

Fixed dose combination (antiretroviral)
Reverse transcriptase inhibitors